AppShield was the world's first Application firewall. AppShield was conceptualized by Eran Reshef and Gili Raanan and was introduced to the market by Perfecto Technologies (now Sanctum) in the summer of 1999. AppShield is a safeguard for many systems as it is protection for code and data. The Appshield product was the first product to inspect incoming Hypertext Transfer Protocol requests and block malicious attacks based on a dynamic policy which was composed by analyzing the outgoing HTML pages. AppShield is used to isolate the target applications registers and address space from the other applications and can utilize memory in a unique way and in return, the rootkit can't access it's memory. The product faced many market adoption challenges and Sanctum was forced to introduce a complementary solution named Appscan to demonstrate the need in Application security.  In 2004, F5 Networks acquired AppShield's intellectual properties from Sanctum and discontinued the technology. Gartner's Magic Quadrant (MQ) 2015 for Web Application Firewalls estimates that the global WAF market size is as big as $420 million, with 24 percent annual growth. AppShield can rewrite application framework in Android and IOS and it will not modify the IOS for the device.

References 

Firewall software